Christopher North may refer to:

 Christopher North (composer) (born 1969), American composer, songwriter, and musician
 Christopher North (Ambrosia) (born 1951), American keyboardist, from the rock band Ambrosia
 Christopher North (writer), the pseudonym of the Scottish essayist John Wilson
 Christopher North (businessman) (born 1970), American CEO

See also
 Chris Noth (born 1954), American actor
 Christopher Nöthe (born 1988), German professional football